Fereej Abdel Aziz is a district in Qatar, located in the municipality of Ad Dawhah.

Etymology
Fereej, the first constituent of the district's name, translates to "neighborhood" in English. The second part of the name, Abdel Aziz, was given after its namesake who was a sheikh that resided in and governed the area.

Transport
Major roads that run through the district are Wadi Mushaireb Street, Mohammed Bin Thani Street, Rawdat Al Khail Street and B Ring Road.

Demographics
As of the 2010 census, the district comprised 2,401 housing units and 309 establishments. There were 10,808 people living in the district, of which 78% were male and 22% were female. Out of the 10,808 inhabitants, 87% were 20 years of age or older and 13% were under the age of 20. The literacy rate stood at 93.4%.

Employed persons made up 78% of the total population. Females accounted for 9% of the working population, while males accounted for 91% of the working population.

References

Communities in Doha